Drost is a Dutch occupational surname. A drost or drossaard  was a kind of bailiff in the Low countries (see landdrost and seneschal). Notable people with the surname include:

Epi Drost (1945–1995), Dutch footballer
Erik Drost (born 1977), Dutch guitarist
Frank Drost (born 1963), Dutch swimmer
Henrico Drost (born 1987), Dutch footballer
Jeff Drost (born 1964), American football player
Jeroen Drost (born 1987), Dutch footballer
Jesper Drost (born 1993), Dutch footballer
Johannes Drost (1880–1954), Dutch swimmer
Monique Drost (born 1964), Dutch swimmer
Peter Drost (born 1958), Dutch swimmer
Robert Drost (born 1970), American computer scientist
Rudolf Drost (1892–1971), German ornithologist
Willem Drost (1633–1659), Dutch painter

See also
Droste, Dutch chocolate manufacturer 

Dutch-language surnames
Occupational surnames